Current and past governments of Afghanistan have included a Minister of Justice in the Afghan cabinet.

The Ministry of Justice of Afghanistan assumes responsibilities such as drafting and reviewing laws and decrees of the president, raising public awareness of legal topics, managing affairs relating to legal aid, and printing and disseminating legislative documents. In 1967, the Ministry of Justice was combined with the Attorney General's Office. By 1977, the Ministry of Justice took over the functions of the Chief Justice.

List of ministers

Ministers of Justice During the Amir Amanullah Khan Period (1919-1926)

Ministers of Justice During the Mohammed Nadir Shah Period (1929-1933)

Ministers of Justice During the Mohammad Zahir Shah Period (1933-1973)

Ministers of Justice for Mohammed Daoud Khan's Presidential Palace (1973-1978)

Ministers of Justice From 1978-1992 (Years involving a coup)

Ministers of Justice During the Mujahideen  Era

Minister of Justice During the Taliban (1996-2001)

Minister of Justice During the Transitional Period (2001-2004)

Ministers of Justice for the Islamic Republic of Afghanistan (2004-2021)

Ministers of Justice for the Islamic Emirate of Afghanistan (2021-present)

See also

 Justice ministry
 Politics of Afghanistan

External links
 Official website

References

Justice
Afghanistan